Diego Tinotenda Chikombeka (born ), professionally known as Diego Tryno is a Zimbabwean urban contemporary and hip-hop musician. He is also known locally by stage names including "Mr. Coffee Please" and "The Future Billionaire".

Early life 
Diego was born in Mutare, Zimbabwe at the Sakubva District Hospital. He was the first child born to his mother Fungisai Kanjera and his father Christopher Chikombeka. While attending primary school, he moved to Zvishavane temporarily and moved back to Mutare to finish his primary education. He attended Chikanga High School before moving to Harare, and finished high school at Living Waters High School. During his schooling, Tryno practiced music privately, as his parents were not tolerant of his decision to pursue music.

Music career 
He once did Zimdancehallmusic under the name Ricky D before switching to hip-hop. Tryno recorded his first hip-hop track in 2014 called "Go Diego Go" and won his first regional award at Zambezi Music Awards the same year. In 2015 he did his first live show at Summer Jam followed by "I wanna see you" dance tour. He does music in English, Shona, and Ndebele and his first Shona track was in 2015 when he featured in a song with singer TC. Tryno has worked with regional and international producers in the production of his music. One notable producer was Dry AFM from Botswana who contributed in the mixing of his song Yolo.

2018 
In October 2018, Tryno released his debut album Lazarus (Age Volume 1) which was the first contribution of his All Generations Entwined project. The album was released in collaboration with Zimbabwean Hip-hop artist Ti Gonzi's album "Best Mero" on the same day and venue and the debut was mistakenly believed to be a Gospel Album. Tryno's debut album was considerably circulated on radio stations including Star Fm, ZiFm, Hevoi Fm in Masvingo and SA's Metro Fm. After his first album, Tryno attempted to mix urban contemporary, sungura, gospel, and Zimbabwean traditional music. October 30, 2018, Diego released his debut video "Mabvuta" live on ZiFm Stereo and Zimbabwe's ZBC TV.

2019 
In 2019 Tryno released his single Cooler Box which made its way to Zimbabwean radio charts and he promised to release his sophomore album Stories (Age Vol 2) which he failed to release on the promised date and it attracted negative feedback from his fans. Zim hip-hop artist Diego Tryno delays album release.... manager blames power cuts 2019 he dismissed rumors about a tour in Kenya and cancelled any other rumored tours.

Nationality and identity 
Tryno was forbade to do music by his family and because of the ban he did music privately and he did not identify as Zimbabwean. He engaged with radio station managers in other countries for airplay and marketing. In South Africa they marketed him as South African on radios and online mediums and in Zambia they marketed him as Zambian. He came out publicly as Zimbabwean in 2018.

Discography

Albums 
 Lazarus (Age Volume 1) (2018)

Singles 
 Lazarus
 Mabvuta
 Sungai
 Hell Naw
 Yolo
 Mama

Videography

Awards and nominations

References

External links 
 Video
 Bio
 Interview on Star FM
 Interview on Hevoi FM

Zimbabwean musicians
Zimbabwean hip hop musicians
1998 births
Living people